Gediminas Petrauskas (born 3 April 1985 in Kaunas, Lithuania) is a Lithuanian basketball coach. He is the head coach of Nevėžis–OPTIBET.

Lithuanian national team
Petrauskas was the head coach of the Lithuanian U-16 National Team during the 2015 FIBA Europe Under-16 Championship. The team won silver medals that year.

References

1985 births
Living people
Lithuanian basketball coaches